Placido Rizzotto (2 January 1914 – 10 March 1948) was an Italian partisan, socialist peasant and trade union leader from Corleone, who was kidnapped and murdered by Sicilian Mafia boss Luciano Leggio on 10 March 1948. Before he was killed, Rizzotto was performing activist work with farm laborers, trying to help them take over unfarmed land on large estates in the area. A 12-year-old shepherd, Giuseppe Letizia, witnessed Rizzotto's murder and was killed the following day with a lethal injection, made by a Mafia doctor Michele Navarra. In the 1960s, Leggio was acquitted twice of Rizzotto's murder due to lack of evidence.

Discovery of body and aftermath
Over 60 years after his death, remains were found on 7 July 2009, on a cliff in Rocca Busambra near Corleone, and on 9 March 2012, a DNA test, compared with one extracted from his father Carmelo Rizzotto, long dead and exhumed for this purpose, confirmed the identity of remains as being that of Placido Rizzotto following a long and difficult investigation conducted by the State Police at the service of the PS Commissariat of Corleone. On 16 March 2012, the Council of Ministers announced a State Funeral for would be held for Rizzotto, which took place in Corleone on 24 May 2012, attended by Italian President Giorgio Napolitano.

A biopic of Placido Rizzotto was made by Pasquale Scimeca, released in 2000.

See also
Il Capo dei Capi
List of solved missing person cases
List of victims of the Sicilian Mafia

References

1914 births
1940s missing person cases
1948 deaths
Antimafia
Formerly missing people
Italian resistance movement members
Missing person cases in Italy
People murdered by the Corleonesi